Nino Serdarušić (born 13 December 1996) is a Croatian tennis player. He has a career-high singles ranking of World No. 183 achieved on 4 April 2022.

Juniors
Serdarušić had a career high junior ranking of No. 21, and partnering Petros Chrysochos, made the doubles semifinals of the 2014 Wimbledon Championships boys' doubles.

Professional career
He made his ATP main draw debut at the 2014 ATP Vegeta Croatia Open Umag in the doubles event, partnering Dino Marcan, losing in the first round to the second seeds Pablo Cuevas and Horacio Zeballos in three sets.

In 2016, he made his first appearance in an ATP singles draw - also in the Croatia Open - losing in straight sets to Teymuraz Gabashvili.

In 2018, he played his first Challenger final in Ostrava, Czechia and he lost against Arthur De Greef 6:4,4:6,2:6. 

In 2021, he reached his second Challenger final in Verona, Italy where he was defeated by Holger Rune.

Personal life
In 2022, after losing in Australian Open qualifying, his brother and coach, Filip Serdarušić, was deported due to being unvaccinated.

Challengers and Futures/World Tennis Tour finals

Singles: 22 (7–15)

Doubles: 32 (23–9)

References

External links
 
 

1996 births
Living people
Croatian male tennis players
Tennis players from Zagreb
Tennis players at the 2014 Summer Youth Olympics